Lacconotus is a genus of palm and flower beetles in the family Mycteridae. There are at least four described species in Lacconotus.

Species
These four species belong to the genus Lacconotus:
 Lacconotus pallidus Van Dyke, 1928
 Lacconotus pinicola Horn, 1879
 Lacconotus pinicolus Horn, 1879
 Lacconotus punctatus LeConte, 1862

References

Further reading

 
 
 

Tenebrionoidea
Articles created by Qbugbot